History of Washington may refer to:

History of Washington (state)
History of Washington, D.C.